Lee Purdy (born 29 May 1987) is a British former professional boxer who competed from 2006 to 2013. He held the British welterweight title in 2011, challenged once for the vacant Commonwealth welterweight title in 2010 and once for the EBU European welterweight title in 2013.

Professional boxing career

British Champion
Purdy claimed the British title with a win over Craig Watson via 5th round stoppage to become Colchesters first British boxing champion at the MEN Arena in Manchester on 16 April 2011.  This victory was followed up in his first defence on 16 July 2011 with another victory over Watson, this time in Oldham and with another stoppage in the 5th round.  Despite starting brightly, Watson began to be worn down in the third round as two heavy shots from Purdy landed.  Eventually after Watson was knocked down twice in the 5th, the referee called a halt to the contest.  Purdy lost the title in his second defence against former British light welterweight champion Colin Lynes.  Purdy lost a majority points decision to Lynes after getting up off the canvas in the 10th to produce a strong finish.

On 18 May 2013, Lee Purdy fought Devon Alexander at Boardwalk Hall, Atlantic City, NJ. The bout was originally scheduled for the IBF welterweight title but Purdy failed to make the weight. Purdy took the fight at 4 weeks notice after Kell Brook pulled out with a hand injury. The fight was controversially stopped by Purdys trainer (Darren Barker) in the 7th round, although Purdy was not hurt at any stage throughout the fight and was looking to come on strong in the later rounds.

Alleged money laundering offence
In August 2013 Purdy was charged with money laundering along with five other people in what was believed to be a £1 million scam against elderly people. He was due to appear at Colchester Magistrates Court in September 2013. Purdy, as well as the other accused, denied the charges. Lee Purdy was found not guilty by unanimous verdict (jury) of money laundering. He thanked everyone who had supported him via Twitter.

After several operations on a detached retina suffered during the Leonard Bundu fight in December 2013, Purdy is expected to return to the ring in 2015 and would possibly meet the winner of the Frankie Gavin and Bradley Skeete bout for the British title.

Retirement
After sustaining a severed and detached retina in a fight with European welterweight champion Leonard Bundu in late 2013, Purdy was forced to retire from the sport of boxing. His promoter Eddie Hearn confirmed the retirement in an interview with iFLTV on 16 February 2015.

Professional boxing record

References

English male boxers
Welterweight boxers
Living people
1987 births
Sportspeople from Colchester